Bayles is a bounded rural locality in Victoria, Australia, 75 kilometers (48 miles) south-east of Melbourne's Central Business District, located within the Shire of Cardinia local government area. Bayles recorded a population of 445 at the 2021 census.

Bayles is located to the east of the town of Koo Wee Rup, on the Koo Wee Rup-Longwarry Road.

History
Bayles Post Office opened on 5 September 1921.

In 1991 the short film 'Plead guilty, get a bond' was filmed in town, using the towns hall as the courthouse.

See also
 City of Cranbourne – Bayles was previously within this former local government area.

References

Shire of Cardinia